Kabaré is a town in the Bilanga Department of Gnagna Province in eastern Burkina Faso. The town has a population of 1,734.

Notes and references

Populated places in the Est Region (Burkina Faso)
Gnagna Province